First United Church may refer to:
 First United Church (Ottawa), Ontario, Canada
 First United Church (Swift Current), Saskatchewan, Canada

See also 
 First United Methodist Church (disambiguation)
 First United Presbyterian Church (disambiguation)